Neil Fassina is the current President of Okanagan College Previously he was Provost and Vice-President Academic at the Northern Alberta Institute of Technology. Fassina holds a PhD from the University of Toronto in Organizational Behavior and Human Resource Management.

References

Living people
Presidents of Athabasca University
1947 births
Canadian university and college chief executives
University of Toronto alumni